Kent Calfee (born May 15, 1949) is an American politician and a Republican member of the Tennessee House of Representatives representing District 32 since January 8, 2013. A picture of him drinking water out of a Hershey's Syrup bottle went viral in 2020. When asked about it, he said he wasn't going to pay for a water bottle that he would probably end up losing.

Education
Calfee attended East Tennessee State University.

Elections
2012 Calfee challenged District 32 Representative Julia Hurley in the August 2, 2012 Republican Primary, winning with 4,611 votes (55.4%), and won the November 6, 2012 General election with 16,447 votes (69.5%) against Democratic nominee Jack McNew and Independent candidate Allen Cole.

References

External links
Official page at the Tennessee General Assembly

Kent Calfee at Ballotpedia
Kent Calfee at OpenSecrets

Place of birth missing (living people)
1949 births
Living people
East Tennessee State University alumni
Republican Party members of the Tennessee House of Representatives
People from Kingston, Tennessee
21st-century American politicians